SAS: Rogue Heroes is a British television historical drama series created by Steven Knight, which depicts the origins of the British Army Special Air Service (SAS) during the Western Desert Campaign of World War II. The storyline is a broadly accurate representation of real events, as described by Ben Macintyre in his book of the same name.

On 4 December 2022, the BBC confirmed that a second series had been commissioned, based upon SAS operations in the European theatre of war.

Premise
The narrative begins in a Cairo hospital in 1941, when, after a failed training exercise, British Army officer David Stirling has the idea of creating a special commando unit which could operate deep behind enemy lines.

Cast
 Connor Swindells as David Stirling
 Jack O'Connell as Paddy Mayne
 Alfie Allen as Jock Lewes
 Sofia Boutella as Eve Mansour
 Dominic West as Dudley Clarke
 Tom Glynn-Carney as Sergeant Mike Sadler
 Amir El-Masry as Dr. Gamal
 Theo Barklem-Biggs as Sergeant Reg Seekings 
 Corin Silva as Sergeant Jim Almonds
 Jacob Ifan as Sergeant Pat Riley
 Dónal Finn as Second Lieutenant Eoin McGonigal
 Jacob McCarthy as Lance-Corporal Johnny Cooper
 Stuart Campbell as Second Lieutenant Bill Fraser
 Bobby Schofield as Sergeant Dave Kershaw
 Nicholas Nunn as Sergeant Peter Mitcham
 Miles Jupp as Major Alfred Knox
 Virgile Bramly as Capitaine Georges Bergé
 César Domboy as Lieutenant 
 Tom Hygreck as Brevet Lieutenant André Zirnheld
 Arthur Orcier as Aspirant Marc Halévy
  as Sergeant Walter Essner
 Moritz Jahn as Corporal Herbert Brückner
 Adrian Lukis as Commander-in-Chief Claude Auchinleck
 Michael Shaeffer as General Neil Ritchie
 Ian Davies as Randolph Churchill
 Jason Watkins as Winston Churchill
 Anthony Calf as Archibald Stirling 
 Kate Cook as Margaret Fraser
 Isobel Laidler as Mirren Barford
 Ralph Davis as Captain Alexander Norton
 David Alcock as Field marshal Jan Smuts

Episodes

Series 1 (2022)

Production
In March 2021, it was announced  that filming had begun on the six part miniseries, with Connor Swindells, Jack O'Connell, Alfie Allen, Sofia Boutella and Dominic West in starring roles. The series was written by Steven Knight and directed by Tom Shankland. In June, César Domboy joined the cast. Location work was done in Morocco.

Release
The series made its premiere on BBC One on 30 October 2022 in the UK. It simultaneously made its US debut on Epix.

The first episode was watched 5,526,000 times on iPlayer alone during 2022, making it the 5th most viewed individual programme on the platform that year.

Reception
Writing in The Guardian, Antony Beevor commented that the series was "unmissable viewing", and "achieved the right balance of irreverence and admiration all the way through with a brilliant contrast in characters".

The review aggregator website Rotten Tomatoes reported an approval rating of 100% with an average rating of 8.3/10, based on 12 critic reviews. The website's critical consensus said: "With a terrific cast inhabiting this roster of likeable rapscallions, Rogue Heroes is a fun throwback to down-and-dirty adventure stories." Metacritic gave the series a weighted average score of 78 out of 100 based on seven critic reviews, indicating "Generally favourable reviews."

SAS: Rogue Heroes was the sixth most-watched UK drama series of 2022, and the fourth most popular of the year on the BBC.

Historical accuracy

At the beginning of each episode, the viewer is informed that the series is "[b]ased on a true story", and that "the events depicted which seem most unbelievable… are mostly true". 

Unlike the main trio of Stirling, Mayne, and Lewes, the character of Eve Mansour is fictional. However, Sofia Boutella, who plays the character, points out how her character's creation is influenced by real-life female spies such as Noor Inayat Khan or Virginia Hall.

As military historian Antony Beevor noted, whilst events surrounding the creation of the SAS "certainly defy belief", it is true that "some liberties with the precise record" were taken – for example, in the scripting of a romantic association between David Stirling and Mansour, the French intelligence agent. However, his opinion was that these were "mainly additions, fleshing out characters and context", rather than being significant "distortions" of the facts.

Billy Foley (writing in The Irish News) was somewhat more critical of the artistic license employed, particularly in the depiction of Paddy Mayne. Far from being "a brutish, rough man who was looked down on by the aristocracy of his native Newtownards and despised the toff officer class of the British army", Foley pointed out that the ostensibly working class Mayne was in fact born to a landed family, went to grammar school, played rugby for the British & Irish Lions, and studied at Queen's University Belfast before qualifying as a solicitor. Historian Damien Lewis also said it was "nonsense" to portray Mayne as a "thug and drunken lout", when he "cared passionately for those men he commanded".
Moreover, it was Stirling who asked General De Gaule to have Frenchmen in the SAS because he needed men ready to do anything to deal with the Germans. So was sent the 1re compagnie de chasseurs parachutistes which will become French Squadron SAS

References

External links

2022 British television series debuts
2020s British drama television series
British action television series
British military television series
BBC television dramas
Television series created by Steven Knight
Television series based on actual events
Television shows based on non-fiction books
World War II television drama series
English-language television shows
Works about the Special Air Service
Television series by Banijay